is the fourth single from the J-pop idol group Morning Musume, released on February 10, 1999 as an 8 cm CD. It sold a total of 410,850 copies, and reached number two on the Oricon Charts. In 2004, it was re-released as part of the Early Single Box and again in 2005 as a 12 cm CD. Lead vocals of this single were Natsumi Abe and Asuka Fukuda. Prior to this singles release, on January 17, 1999, Fukuda shocked viewers of the television show Asayan with her decision to "graduate" from Morning Musume and continue with her studies.

"Never Forget", one of the coupling tracks on the single, is often traditionally sung by band members at their graduation concerts and/or final TV appearances with the group, prior to embarking on solo careers or new groups.

Track listing 
All songs written by Tsunku.

8 cm CD 
  – 5:05
 "Happy Night" – 5:13
 "Never Forget" – 4:35
 "Memory Seishun no Hikari (Instrumental)" – 5:04

12 cm CD (Early Single Box and individual release) 
 "Memory Seishun no Hikari" – 5:05
 "Happy Night" – 5:12
 "Never Forget" – 4:37
 "Memory Seishun no Hikari (Instrumental)" – 5:05
 "Memory Seishun no Hikari (Instrumental)" – 5:10

Members at the time of single 
 1st generation: Yuko Nakazawa, Aya Ishiguro, Kaori Iida, Natsumi Abe, Asuka Fukuda 
 2nd generation: Kei Yasuda, Mari Yaguchi, Sayaka Ichii

External links 
 Memory Seishun no Hikari entry on the Up-Front Works official website

1999 singles
Morning Musume songs
Zetima Records singles
Songs written by Tsunku
Song recordings produced by Tsunku
1999 songs
Torch songs
Pop ballads
1990s ballads